Tothillia is a genus of flies in the family Tachinidae.

Species
 Tothillia sinensis Chao & Zhou, 1993

References

Tachinidae
Diptera of Asia
Taxa named by Roger Ward Crosskey